Wu Lizhu (born 1968) is a Chinese chemist specializing in organic chemistry.

Early life
Wu was born in 1968 in Qinzhou District of Tianshui, Gansu into a Hui family. Her father Wu Jiantao and mother Ma Xian'e were a professors at Northwest University for Nationalities. Her grandfather Wu Hongjian was a member of the China Democratic League and vice chairman of the Tianshui Committee of the Chinese People's Political Consultative Conference. Her great-uncle Wu Hongbin was mayor of Tianshui, vice chairman of the Standing Committee of Gansu Provincial People's Congress and executive vice chairman of Gansu Provincial Committee of the Chinese People's Political Consultative Conference.

Education
After graduation, she worked there, becoming associate research fellow in 1996 and research fellow in 1998. From 1997 to 1998 she was a postdoc at the University of Hong Kong under the supervision of Chi-Ming Che.

Career
She is now a researcher and doctoral supervisor at the Technical Institute of Physics and Chemistry, Chinese Academy of Sciences (CAS).

Honours and awards
 2001 Distinguished Young Scholar by the National Science Fund 
 2010 The 7th China Young Female Scientist Award
 2011 Li Yuehua Outstanding Instructor Award
 November 22, 2019 Member of the Chinese Academy of Sciences (CAS)

References

External links
 Wu Lizhu on the Chinese Academy of Sciences (CAS)

Living people
People from Tianshui
Chemists from Gansu
Lanzhou University alumni
Alumni of the University of Hong Kong
Members of the Chinese Academy of Sciences
Chinese women chemists
1968 births